This is a list of the National Register of Historic Places listings in Garfield County, Utah.

This is intended to be a complete list of the properties and districts on the National Register of Historic Places in Garfield County, Utah, United States. Latitude and longitude coordinates are provided for many National Register properties and districts; these locations may be seen together in a map.

There are 27 properties and districts listed on the National Register in the county, including 1 National Historic Landmark.



Current listings

|}

See also
 List of National Historic Landmarks in Utah
 National Register of Historic Places listings in Utah
 National Register of Historic Places listings in Bryce Canyon National Park

References

External links

Garfield